The 2022 UEFA Futsal Championship, commonly referred to as UEFA Futsal Euro 2022, was the 12th edition of the UEFA Futsal Championship, the international futsal championship organised by UEFA for the men's national teams of Europe. It was hosted for the first time in the Netherlands.

This is the first tournament to be held on a four-year basis and featuring 16 teams, as the competition was previously played every two years and included 12 teams since 2010. It took place between 19 January and 6 February 2022.

Portugal won their second title in a row after defeating Russia in the final 4–2, thus becoming the second national team, after Spain, to successfully defend the title.

Host selection
The bidding procedure for hosting was launched on 12 October 2018, with a deadline of 21 January 2019 to express their interest in hosting. Seven associations expressed an interest in hosting:

The final proposal had to delivered with the bid dossier by 30 May 2019 at the latest, and UEFA received three bids:
: Lille and Orchies
: Amsterdam and Groningen
: Lisbon and Porto

The UEFA Executive Committee selected the Netherlands as hosts on 24 September 2019 in Ljubljana.

Qualification

The 15 teams which joined automatically qualified hosts Netherlands in the finals were decided by qualifying running from 29 January 2020 to November 2021.

Qualified teams
The following 16 teams qualify for the final tournament.

1 Bold indicates champions for that year. Italic indicates hosts for that year.

Final draw
The final draw was held in Zeist on 18 October 2021. The teams were seeded according to the UEFA senior men's futsal national team coefficient rankings, with the winner of the play-off taking the ranking of the contender with the higher coefficient, Serbia. For political reasons, Russia and Ukraine could not be drawn in the same group or in groups scheduled to be played on the same day (due to a potential clash of teams and clash of fans).

Venues
The tournament was held at two venues:

Squads

Each national team have to submit a squad of 14 players, two of whom must be goalkeepers. During the final tournament, each team is allowed to replace a maximum of one outfield player if he is injured or ill severely enough to prevent his participation in the tournament. Each team is also allowed to temporarily replace a goalkeeper if there are fewer than two healthy goalkeepers.

Group stage
The group winners and runners-up advance to the quarter-finals.

Tiebreakers
In the group stage, teams are ranked according to points (3 points for a win, 1 point for a draw, 0 points for a loss), and if tied on points, the following tiebreaking criteria are applied, in the order given, to determine the rankings (Regulations Articles 20.01 and 20.02):
Points in head-to-head matches among tied teams;
Goal difference in head-to-head matches among tied teams;
Goals scored in head-to-head matches among tied teams;
If more than two teams are tied, and after applying all head-to-head criteria above, a subset of teams are still tied, all head-to-head criteria above are reapplied exclusively to this subset of teams;
Goal difference in all group matches;
Goals scored in all group matches;
Penalty shoot-out if only two teams have the same number of points, and they met in the last round of the group and are tied after applying all criteria above (not used if more than two teams have the same number of points, or if their rankings are not relevant for qualification for the next stage);
Disciplinary points (red card = 3 points, yellow card = 1 point, expulsion for two yellow cards in one match = 3 points);
UEFA coefficient ranking for the final draw.

All times are local, CET (UTC+1).

Group A

Group B

Group C

Group D

Knockout stage
In the knockout stage, extra time and penalty shoot-out are used to decide the winner if necessary, except for the third place match where extra time is not played but a direct penalty shoot-out is used, instead.

Bracket

Quarter-finals

Semi-finals

Third place match

Final

Ranking and statistics
 Top eight teams advanced to the Knockout stage.

Final ranking

References

External links

Futsal Euro Matches: 2022, UEFA.com

 
2022
Uefa
January 2022 sports events in the Netherlands
February 2022 sports events in the Netherlands
International futsal competitions hosted by the Netherlands